‌The 2018 Asian Club League Handball Championship was the 21st edition of the championship held under the aegis of Asian Handball Federation. The championship was hosted by Kuwait Handball Association at Al Kuwait Sports Club Stadium, Kuwait City (Kuwait) from 20 March to 1 April 2019. It was the official competition for men's handball clubs of Asia crowning the Asian champions whose winner will also qualify for the 2019 IHF Super Globe.

Participating clubs

Final standings

References

External links
 asianhandball.com Official Website of the Asian Handball Federation

Handball competitions in Asia
Asian Handball Championships
Asian Men's Club League Handball Championship, 2018
Asia
International sports competitions hosted by Kuwait